The 2015–16 South African Premier Division season (known as the ABSA Premiership for sponsorship reasons) is the twentieth season of the Premier Soccer League since its establishment in 1996.

Mamelodi Sundowns won their seventh league title in dominant fashion, finishing 14 points ahead of second-place BV Wits. League newcomers Jomo Cosmos fell into last place for the first all year in their final game and will be relegated to the National First Division for the 2016-17 season.

Teams

Stadiums and locations

Football teams in South Africa tend to use multiple stadiums over the course of a season for their home games. The following table will only indicate the stadium used most often by the club for their home games

Personnel and kits

League table

Positions by round

Season statistics

Scoring

Top scorers

Hat-tricks

4 Player scored 4 goals.

See also
 CAF 5 Year Ranking

References

External links
Official Website

Premier Soccer League seasons
1
2015–16 in African association football leagues